St Mary and St Romuald is a Roman Catholic parish church in the parish of Yarm, North Yorkshire, England. Administratively, it is part of the Diocese of Middlesbrough.

History
The Church of St. Mary and St. Romuald is located on land that was at one time attached to the Black Friars monastery, which was founded at Yarm in 1260.  

The parish originated as a domestic chaplaincy to the Meynell family.  In 1860, the parish received its own free-standing church, a gift from Thomas Meynell to his wife. The church is dedicated to Our Lady of York, Mother of Mercy, and St. Romuald, abbot and monastic founder. St. Romuald was born in Ravenna, a favourite resort of the Meynells. 

The current parish priest is Fr. Neil McNicholas, who was appointed in 2015. He is the author of several books on Catholicism.

Architecture
The church was designed by Hadfield &  Goldie of Sheffield. It is constructed of red brick with a slate roof, and is "a well-detailed example of the use of structural polychromatic brickwork, popular in the 1860s". 

The East window was designed by John Hardman Powell of Hardman & Co.

The church is a Grade II listed building, as it "represents a relatively early and little altered church" by the Catholic architect George Goldie.

References

External links

 Diocese website
 Parish website

Yarm
Roman Catholic churches completed in 1860
19th-century Roman Catholic church buildings in the United Kingdom
George Goldie church buildings
Saints Mary and Romuald